Ghost Reveries is the eighth studio album by Swedish progressive metal band Opeth. It was released on 29 August 2005. It was their first album after signing with Roadrunner Records, and first album since Still Life (1999) to not be produced by Steven Wilson.

Ghost Reveries is the first album by Opeth to include keyboardist Per Wiberg as a "permanent" member (although Wiberg contributed keyboard work to Opeth's live performances starting around the time of Lamentations), and it is the last Opeth album to include drummer Martin Lopez and long-time guitarist Peter Lindgren.

The album's only single is "The Grand Conjuration". A music video of the song was released, although about half of the song was edited from the video, due to the length of the song. Lopez does not appear in the video, as he was sick and was temporarily replaced by Gene Hoglan.

Background
Opeth returned home in 2004 to start writing new material for its eighth album, and by the end of the year, they had finished writing it. For the first time since Still Life, the songs for Ghost Reveries were written for the album before going into the studio. This gave Opeth three weeks to rehearse and perfect the recording in the studio. The band had to decide whether to record the album at Fascination Street Studios in Örebro, Sweden, or at Sonic Ranch. They eventually chose Fascination Street Studios, as it was closer to their homes. 

Opeth's European label, Music for Nations, closed its doors in 2005, and after negotiations with various labels, the band signed with Roadrunner Records. Åkerfeldt said the primary reason for signing with Roadrunner was the label's wide distribution, ensuring the album would be available at larger-chain retailers. When news leaked that the band was signed to Roadrunner, who predominantly worked with trend-oriented rock and metal, some fans accused the band of selling out. "To be honest," Åkerfeldt said, "that's such an insult after 15 years as a band and 8 records. I can't believe we haven't earned each and every Opeth fan's credibility after all these years. I mean, our songs are 10 minutes long!"

Style
The album marks a temporary return to the progressive metal styles of the previous albums and features death growls, though still includes some of the progressive rock elements of Damnation.

Ghost Reveries was initially intended to be a concept album, with numerous tracks linking together a story of a man's turmoil after committing an unconscionable act, symbolised by killing his own mother. However, Mikael Åkerfeldt commented:
 The album only partly portrays a concept, not fully arranged in the poetic manner as previous releases such as Still Life and My Arms, Your Hearse.

"The Baying of the Hounds" is partially inspired by lyrics from the song "Diana" from Comus's album First Utterance.

Artwork
The artwork was created after the completion of the album. Åkerfeldt commented on the artwork, saying:

Release
Ghost Reveries was released in Europe on 29 August 2005, and in North America on 30 August 2005.

A special edition of the album was released by Roadrunner Records on 31 October 2006. It is packaged in a large digipak and contains a CD and DVD, along with new cover art and an extended booklet featuring extra album artwork and a letter from Åkerfeldt. The CD contains the original tracks from the album, as well as a bonus cover of "Soldier of Fortune" by Deep Purple, which was recorded as a live take with the band's new drummer, Martin Axenrot. The DVD contains a Dolby 5.1 surround sound mix (not including the bonus track), a 40-minute documentary, and the video for "The Grand Conjuration". This documentary details the making of Ghost Reveries, offering a behind-the-scenes look at the band's day-to-day life while recording and touring.

Some copies of Ghost Reveries were mastered using HDCD. Although it is unmarked, playing the album in a CD player able to decode HDCD will give superior sound quality.

"Ghost of Perdition" is included in the soundtrack for the video game Saints Row 2 on the radio station Krunch 106.66. As of 29 November 2011, it is also available for download for the video game Rock Band 3. "The Grand Conjuration" is included in the soundtrack for the video game Sleeping Dogs, on the radio station "roadrunner records". It is also included in the soundtrack for the video game Final Fight: Streetwise, being the boss battle theme song of one of the game's bosses, Famine.

Release history

Reception

Ghost Reveries peaked on the Billboard 200 at number 64 and number 62 in the UK. The album reached number nine in Sweden, higher than any previous Opeth release.

Ghost Reveries received widespread acclaim upon release. Thom Jurek of AllMusic cited Ghost Reveries as a culmination of everything Opeth had worked towards throughout their career. Jurek defined the album as "fully realized, stunningly beautiful, and emotionally fragmented; it's a terrain where power, tenderness, and sheer grief hold forth under heavy manners. Awesome." Billboard described the album as delving further towards Opeth's progressive tendencies, commenting that the "alternating between powerful metal bursts and gauzy atmospheres requires patient listening, but it allows for better exploration of the beautifully dark world Opeth creates." Brandon Stosuy of Pitchfork praised Opeth's diverse musical influences and instrumentation, as a blend of "prog, jazz, stoner haze, blues-rock, Indian raga, pastoral tips, and acid-tinged freakers." Exclaim! reviewer Max Deneau similarly praised their songwriting and musicianship as key to Opeth's formula, whilst commenting on the addition of keyboardist Per Wiberg as having added "a volatile new dynamic to the band." Keith Bergman of Blabbermouth.net gave the album ten out of ten, one of only 21 albums to achieve a perfect rating from the site. Decibel called Ghost Reveries "achingly beautiful, sometimes unabashedly brutal, often a combination of both." The Aquarian Weekly placed Ghost Reveries among the band's finest work, writing: "This record was in the running for best metal release of the year before it even came out and now that it has, it may very well have decimated any competition."

Ghost Reveries was named the best album of 2005 by Metal Hammer. It was also ranked No. 1 on PopMatters "Best Metal Albums of 2005" and on webzine  Metal Storm. Ghost Reveries appeared on many end of year lists, including Kerrang!, Terrorizer, Drowned In Sound and The Village Voice'''s Pazz & Jop poll. In a retrospective list, Loudwire named it the best metal album of 2005.

In 2014, TeamRock put Ghost Reveries at #46 on their "Top 100 Greatest Prog Albums of All Time" list commenting that "this was a partial concept album, with Satanism as its theme. It’s now regarded as one of the defining albums of 21st-century progressive metal." Loudwire placed the album at #3 on their "Top 100 Hard Rock and Heavy Metal Albums of the 21st Century" list, only being beaten out by System of a Down's Toxicity (#2) and Tool's Lateralus'' (#1).

Track listing

Notes

Personnel

Band
 Mikael Åkerfeldt – vocals, rhythm guitar, lead guitar, acoustic guitar, Mellotron
 Peter Lindgren – lead guitar
 Martín Méndez – bass 
 Per Wiberg – Hammond organ, Mellotron, grand piano, Moog
 Martin Lopez – drums, percussion

Production
Jens Bogren – production, engineering, mixing, mastering (at Cutting Room Studios), 5.1 remix
Opeth – production, engineering, mixing, mastering, art direction, recording ("Soldier of Fortune")
Pontus Olsson – engineering ("Soldier of Fortune"), mixing ("Soldier of Fortune")
Rickard Bengtsson – recording
Anders Alexandersson – recording
Niklas Källgren – recording
Thomas Eberger – mastering

Additional personnel
Travis Smith – art direction, illustration, layout
Anthony Sorrento – band portraits

Charts

Weekly

Monthly

References

External links
 ''Ghost Reveries'''s equipment at Opeth.com

Opeth albums
2005 albums
Roadrunner Records albums
Albums produced by Jens Bogren
Albums with cover art by Travis Smith (artist)